Barry Markus (born 17 July 1991 in Amsterdam) is a Dutch professional racing cyclist, who last rode for UCI Continental team .

His younger sister Kelly Markus is also a cyclist.

Major results

2008
 3rd Time trial, National Junior Road Championships
 4th Road race, UCI Juniors World Championships
 6th Paris–Roubaix Juniors
2009
 1st Stage 1 Trofeo Karlsberg
 2nd  Road race, UEC European Junior Road Championships
 3rd Madison, National Track Championships (with Yoeri Havik)
 3rd Paris–Roubaix Juniors
2010
 1st Stage 2 Thüringen Rundfahrt der U23
 National Track Championships
2nd Madison (with Yoeri Havik)
3rd Points race
3rd Scratch
 9th Beverbeek Classic
 10th Ronde van Drenthe
2011
 National Track Championships
1st  Madison (with Roy Pieters)
3rd Scratch
 1st Ster van Zwolle
 1st Dorpenomloop Rucphen
 Vuelta Ciclista a León
1st Stages 1 & 2b (TTT)
 2nd Grand Prix de la ville de Nogent-sur-Oise
 10th Overall Ronde van Drenthe
2012
 2nd Dwars door Drenthe
 3rd  Scratch, UEC European Under-23 Track Championships
 3rd Scratch, National Track Championships
 5th Memorial Rik Van Steenbergen
 8th Dutch Food Valley Classic
2013
 3rd Scheldeprijs
 9th Grand Prix de Denain
 10th Overall Arctic Race of Norway
2014
 2nd Rund um Köln
 10th Nokere Koerse
2015
 2nd Dwars door Drenthe
 7th Nokere Koerse
2016
 8th Arnhem–Veenendaal Classic

References

External links 

 
 
 

1991 births
Living people
Dutch male cyclists
Cyclists from Amsterdam